Dircaea is a genus of beetles belonging to the family Melandryidae. The species of this genus are found in Europe, Japan and North America.

Species
The following species are recognised in the genus Dircaea:

Dircaea australis 
Dircaea horiei 
Dircaea liturata 
Dircaea quadriguttata

References

Melandryidae